Prior to its uniform adoption of proportional representation in 1999, the United Kingdom used first-past-the-post for the European elections in England, Scotland and Wales. The European Parliament constituencies used under that system were smaller than the later regional constituencies and only had one Member of the European Parliament each.

From 1984 to 1999, the constituency of Merseyside West was one of them, following on from the previous "Liverpool" constituency which existed on different boundaries from 1979 to 1984.

When it was created in England in 1984, it consisted of the Westminster Parliament constituencies of Bootle, Crosby, Liverpool Broadgreen, Liverpool Mossley Hill, Liverpool Riverside, Liverpool Walton, Liverpool West Derby, Southport,  and remained broadly the same, despite the internal re-arrangement of some of these constituencies (Wavertree replacing Broadgreen and Mossley Hill, and a boundary shift for some of the others).

Ken Stewart, a left-wing and anti-Europe Labour councillor, won the seat for Labour in 1984 from the Liverpool constituency's incumbent Gloria Hooper, later Baroness Hooper. He retained it in 1989 and 1994 with increased majorities. His death in 1996 triggered a by-election, one of a number of crucial by-elections resulting in comfortable Labour victories in the closing months of John Major's Conservative government. Labour's candidate was Richard Corbett, pro-Europe (and later the Leader of the Labour MEPs, the EPLP), who held the seat until it was abolished with the introduction of the regional constituency proportional representation system in 1999. Corbett won the selection to be the Labour candidate in a ballot of all party members in the constituency, winning out against David Watts, later MP for St Helens, Margaret Wall (later Baroness Wall of New Barnet), David Martin, leader of Sefton Council and a number of other local councillors from Liverpool and Bootle.

Under the regional constituency system, Merseyside West became part of North West England.

MEPs

Election results

References

External links
 David Boothroyd's United Kingdom Election Results

European Parliament constituencies in England (1979–1999)
Politics of Merseyside
1984 establishments in England
1999 disestablishments in England
Constituencies established in 1984
Constituencies disestablished in 1999